John Jett (born November 11, 1968) is a former American football punter in the National Football League for the Dallas Cowboys and the Detroit Lions. He played college football for East Carolina University. Jett won two Super Bowl rings with the Cowboys in Super Bowl XXVIII and Super Bowl XXX.

Early years
Jett attended Northumberland High School where he played football and baseball, receiving All-State honors as a pitcher and outfielder.

Although Jett came to East Carolina University as an unrecruited walk-on athlete, he became a 4-year starter at Punter. He graduated after recording two of the three best single season averages in school history, setting the records for career punting average (40.0) and yards-per-punt average in a season (42.2).

In 2007, he was inducted into the East Carolina Athletics Hall of Fame.

Professional career

Minnesota Vikings
Jett was signed as an undrafted free agent by the Minnesota Vikings in 1992 and was released before the start of the season.

Dallas Cowboys
On March 10, 1993, he was signed by the Dallas Cowboys and replaced Mike Saxon on the defending Super Bowl champion. He  finished the year with a 41.8 yards gross average, third in the NFC in net punting average (37.7) and led the league in percentage of punts downed inside the 20-yard line (39.3%).

In 1994, he had a gross average of 41.9 yards (sixth in the NFC), led the league in percentage of punts downed inside the 20-yard line (37.1%) and his 26 punts that landed inside the 20-yard line were the third highest ever in franchise history. In the divisional playoff win against the Green Bay Packers, he registered the third best punting performance in Cowboys playoff history, with a 45.8 yard gross average.

In 1995, he had a gross average of 40.9 yards and a net average of 34.5. After a block, in the NFC Championship Game win against the Green Bay Packers, he went on to average 45.8 yards and tie the mark for the third highest punting average in the franchise postseason history, receiving NFC Special Teams Player of the Week honors. The next year, he was fourth in the NFC in net average (36.8 yards).

During his time with the team, he led the NFL in punts inside the 20 yard-line for four straight seasons.

Detroit Lions
Jett was signed as a free agent by the Detroit Lions in 1997, after the salary cap-strapped Cowboys could not afford to re-sign him.

In 2000, he was named as an alternate to the Pro Bowl.

He missed three games with a calf injury in 2001. The next year, he was second in the NFC in net average (38 yards), sixth in gross average (42.2 yards) and third in punts inside the 20-yard line (29).

On October 30, 2003, he was placed on the injured reserve list, with what turned out to be a career-ending calf injury.

References

External links
Mariucci Says Punter Jett 'definitely A Weapon'

1968 births
Living people
American football punters
East Carolina Pirates football players
Dallas Cowboys players
Detroit Lions players
People from Northumberland County, Virginia
Players of American football from Richmond, Virginia